Gerlane is an unincorporated community in Barber County, Kansas, United States.

History
Gerlane once had its own bank, the Gerlane State Bank, chartered in 1917. Gerlane was situated on the Atchison, Topeka and Santa Fe Railway, but declined after the tracks were removed in 1942.

A post office was opened in Gerlane in 1909, and remained in operation until it was discontinued in 1943.

References

Further reading

External links
 Barber County maps: Current, Historic, KDOT

Unincorporated communities in Barber County, Kansas
Unincorporated communities in Kansas